Artur Tavkazakhov (born June 30, 1976) is a retired amateur Uzbek freestyle wrestler, who competed in the men's welterweight category. He represented his nation Uzbekistan at the 2004 Summer Olympics, and also trained and competed as a member of the Uzbek National Wrestling Team under his personal coach Kazbek Debagaev.

Tavkazakhov qualified for the Uzbek squad in the men's 66 kg class at the 2004 Summer Olympics in Athens. Earlier in the process, he placed second behind neighboring Kazakhstan's Leonid Spiridonov in the same category from the Olympic Qualification Tournament in Bratislava, Slovakia. He lost his opening match 2–8 to eventual Olympic bronze medalist Makhach Murtazaliev, but bounced back to thrash Iran's Alireza Dabir with a rigid 3–2 decision. Placing second in the prelim pool and thirteenth overall, Tavkazakhov failed to advance to the quarterfinals.

References

External links
 

1976 births
Living people
Uzbekistani male sport wrestlers
Olympic wrestlers of Uzbekistan
Wrestlers at the 2004 Summer Olympics
Sportspeople from Tashkent